David Bedey (born 1954) is an American politician who serves in the Montana House of Representatives, representing the 86th district since 2019.

References

1954 births
Living people
Republican Party members of the Montana House of Representatives
21st-century American politicians
University of Alaska Fairbanks alumni
Naval War College alumni
Montana State University alumni